Home is a 1915 British silent drama film directed by Maurice Elvey and starring Elisabeth Risdon, Fred Groves and A. V. Bramble. A poor girl discovers she is really a Duke's daughter, but eventually returns to her own family of fishermen.

Cast
 Elisabeth Risdon as Joan Bicester  
 Fred Groves as Steven Armitage 
 A. V. Bramble as Dan  
 M. Gray Murray as Duke 
 Compton Coutts
 Clarence Derwent
 Pauline Peters
 Joyce Templeton

References

Bibliography
 Murphy, Robert. Directors in British and Irish Cinema: A Reference Companion. British Film Institute, 2006.

External links
 

1915 films
British drama films
British silent feature films
1910s English-language films
Films directed by Maurice Elvey
1915 drama films
Films set in England
British black-and-white films
1910s British films
Silent drama films